Prothalotia porteri is a species of sea snail, a marine gastropod mollusk in the family Trochidae, the top snails.

Description

Distribution
This marine species is endemic to Australia and occurs off Lord Howe Island.

References

 Iredale, T. 1940. Marine molluscs from Lord Howe Island, Norfolk Island, Australia, and New Caledonia. The Australian Zoologist 9(4): 429–443, pl. 32–34

porteri
Gastropods of Australia
Gastropods described in 1940